The 2008 City of Ipswich 400 is the seventh round of the 2008 V8 Supercar season. It was held on the weekend of July 18 to 20 at Queensland Raceway in Ipswich, Queensland.

Practice
Practice featured another opportunity for teams to test endurance co-drivers with Steve Owen ending up the fastest of those drivers in the Jim Beam Racing Falcon, second only in the session to Russell Ingall. Warren Luff was fifth fastest in the second Jim Beam Falcon just ahead of Paul Radisich in the HSV Dealer Team Commodore. Next were Craig Baird (Holden Racing Team) and David Besnard (Stone Brothers Racing). Other co-drivers in the session were Dean Canto (Ford Performance Racing), Glenn Seton (Holden Racing Team), Jason Bargwanna (Rod Nash Racing), Grant Denyer (Ford Rising Stars Racing), Luke Youlden (Ford Performance Racing), Mark Noske (Tasman Motorsport), Jack Perkins (Jack Daniel's Racing), Adam Macrow driving the Team Kiwi Racing Falcon instead of for his enduro team Britek Motorsport, Brad Jones (Brad Jones Racing) and David Reynolds (HSV Dealer Team).

Qualifying
Qualifying was held on Saturday July 19.

Race 1
Race 1 was held on Saturday July 19.

Race 2
Race 2 was held on Sunday July 20.

Race 3
Race 3 was held on Sunday July 20.

Results
Results as follows:

Qualifying

Race 1 results

Race 2 results

Race 3 results

Standings
After round 7 of 14.

Support categories
The 2008 City of Ipswich 400 had five support categories.

References

External links
July 2008.QR1 Official timing and results

City of Ipswich 400